Chaminade High School is a Roman Catholic Marianist college preparatory high school for boys in Mineola on Long Island, New York. Chaminade’s main campus is also home to Saragossa Retreat Center, one of their three retreat houses.

Athletics
The 2016 soccer team finished the season ranked seventh in the nation by USA Today on its final Super 25 Expert Rankings.

Chaminade offers the following sports:

Fall
 Crew
 Varsity / JV / freshman cross country
 Varsity / JV / freshman football
 Varsity / JV / JVB soccer
 Freshman swimming
Winter
 Indoor Track and field
 Varsity / JV wrestling
 Varsity / JV / freshman basketball
 Varsity bowling
 Varsity / JV hockey
 Varsity riflery
 Varsity swimming
Spring
 Outdoor Track and field
 Varsity / JV / JVB baseball
 Crew
 Varsity golf
 Varsity / JV / JVB lacrosse
 Varsity tennis
 Varsity volleyball

Other

 Chaminade owns a theater pipe organ having 3 manuals and 15 ranks, in the school's 1,200-seat Darby Auditorium. The organ consists of a Robert Morton console with ranks by Wurlitzer, Robert Morton, Austin, and Barton.
 A renovation of Chaminade's athletic facilities was completed in 2014. This included the replacement of artificial turf on Ott Field and the addition of turf on Thomas Field. A new stadium was constructed adjacent to Ott Field. Gold Star Stadium was dedicated on September 6, 2014, in honor of gold star alumni.
 A new day retreat center, Saragossa, has been constructed. Located next to the AAC on Marcellus Road, the retreat center serves as Chaminade's third retreat house.
The Dolan Family Science, Technology and Research Center opened in 2018, including state of the art science labs and the only Foucault pendulum in a high school in New York.
Its former president, Fr. James Williams, was accused of sexual abuse and misconduct during his tenure as President.

Notable alumni

Sean Coffey (Class of 1974), retired Navy Captain and former federal prosecutor
 Luke Cummo (Class of 1998), competed on The Ultimate Fighter 2, professional mixed martial artist
 Alfonse D'Amato (Class of 1955), United States Senator from New York, from 1981 to 1999
Brian Dennehy, Emmy and Tony Award-winning stage, film and television actor
 Louis Gerstner (Class of 1959), former chairman and CEO of IBM and The Carlyle Group
 Al Groh (Class of 1962), football player and former coach of NFL's New York Jets 
 Kemp Hannon (Class of 1963), former member of the New York State Senate
 Glenn Hughes, singer, The Village People
 Stephen Karopczyc, recipient of Medal of Honor
 George Kennedy (Class of 1943), Academy Award-winning actor
 Jim Kissane, professional basketball player
 John Lannan, former Major League Baseball player for the Washington Nationals, Philadelphia Phillies, and New York Mets
 Gene Larkin, former Major League Baseball player for Minnesota Twins
 Jack Martins, member of the New York Senate from the 7th district from January 1, 2011 until December 31, 2016
 Bob McKillop, head coach of Davidson College basketball team
 Joe Mullaney, basketball player and coach
 Bill O'Reilly (Class of 1967), television host, political commentator, and author
 Kevin Reilly, television network president at Fox, NBC, FX, Turner, and Warner Media
 Ted Robinson, sportscaster
 Christopher Ruddy, CEO of Newsmax Media
 Thomas Spota, former Suffolk County District Attorney
 Richard J. Sullivan (Class of 1982), United States Circuit Court Judge for the Second Circuit
 Thomas Suozzi, U.S. Congressman, member of House of Representatives from New York's 3rd congressional district
 Vinoo Varghese, criminal defense attorney and television legal analyst 
 Robert C. Wright, former chairman and CEO of NBC Universal and vice-chairman of General Electric

References

External links

Chaminade High School

Mineola, New York
Educational institutions established in 1930
Catholic secondary schools in New York (state)
 
Roman Catholic Diocese of Rockville Centre
Schools in Nassau County, New York
Marianist schools
1930 establishments in New York (state)
Boys' schools in New York (state)